Fort Benson was a Fort built in 1856 in present-day Colton in San Bernardino County, California. The Fort is named for its builder, Jerome Benson. The Fort was abandoned a year after it was built in 1857. Fort Benson was designated a California Historic Landmark (No.617) on September 11, 1957. Jerome Benson, in fear, built the Fort because of land disputes. The fort on his land claim, was made of earthworks and wood. The fort was defended by a brass cannon. The fort was used only one year as about half the Mormons around his land were told to return to Utah during the Mormon War, also call the Utah War. 
On December 27, 1858, the US Army arrived into San Bernardino. The US Army's Mojave Expedition leader was Colonel William Hoffman. He placed troops in San Bernardino and Cajon Pass to deal with Indians and the land problems. Fort Benson is gone and only a marker is at the spot of the fort.

The Utah War (1857–1858) was an armed confrontation between Mormon settlers in the Utah Territory and the armed forces of the United States government. The confrontation lasted from May 1857 to July 1858. There were some casualties, mostly non-Mormon civilians. The war had no notable military battles. 
 the Mormon War, or the Mormon Rebellion In 1857–1858, President James Buchanan sent U.S. forces to the Utah Territory in what became known as the Utah Expedition. The Mormons, fearful that the large U.S. military force had been sent to annihilate them and having faced persecution in other areas, made preparations for defense. Though bloodshed was to be avoided, and the U.S. government also hoped that its purpose might be attained without the loss of life, both sides prepared for war. The Mormons manufactured or repaired firearms, turned scythes into bayonets, and burnished and sharpened long-unused sabres.The Aiken massacre took place the following month. In October 1857, Mormons arrested six Californians traveling through Utah and charged them with being spies for the U.S. Army. They were released, but were later murdered and robbed of their stock and $25,000.
Taking all incidents into account, MacKinnon estimates that approximately 150 people died as a direct result of the year-long Utah War, including the 120 migrants killed at Mountain Meadows. He points out that this was close to the number of people killed during the seven-year contemporaneous struggle in "Bleeding Kansas". In the end, negotiations between the United States and the Latter-day Saints resulted in a full pardon for the Mormons (except those involved in the Mountain Meadows murders), the transfer of Utah's governorship from church President Brigham Young to non-Mormon Alfred Cumming, and the peaceful entrance of the U.S. Army into Utah.

Jedediah Smith camped the spot of the Fort in January 1827, on his first trip to California. He had departed San Diego after visiting Mexican Governor José María de Echeandía and was heading to the Central Valley after being ordered to leave.

Jumuba rancheria
The Fort is also the place the Jumuba Native Indians lived. Jumuba lived in three groups of huts near fresh water springs by present-day Hunts Lane, just south of the Interstate 10. The first written record of this group was from a Spanish missionary José Bernardo Sánchez (September 7, 1778 – January 15, 1833). In September 1821 he found the tribe living in huts and caring for cattle at the Jumuba rancheria. The Jumuba rancheria was found several miles west of Guachama Mission Station, also called Guachama Rancheria, built in 1810, in present-day Bunker Hill, Politana, California.

Markers
Marker at the site reads: (Marker is at 601 South Hunts Lane and 2194 E Oliver Holmes Rd, Colton, California)
NO. 617 FORT BENSON – This is the site of an adobe fortification erected about 1856–57 by the 'Independent' faction in a dispute with the Mormons over a land title. The fort was maintained for about a year. This also is the site of the Indian village of Jumuba, and Jedediah Smith camped here in January 1827. Erected in 1935 by Lugonia Parlor No, 241, N.D.G.W and Arrowhead Parlor No. 110, N.S.G.W. (Marker Number 617.)

Also north of the Fort is marker to Jedediah Smith Pathfinder of the Southern Sierras:
Born at Brambridge in Northern N.Y. January 6, 1799 he discovered south pass of the Rocky Mts. the great gateway through which passed nearly all subsequent migration west and northwest from the Atlantic to the Pacific. He was the first American to enter California by the overland route through Cajon Pass in November 1826. Jedediah Smith stands peerless among the pathfinders of California's epic past. Erected 1951 by Lugonia Parlor 241 Native Daughters of Golden West. 

The nearby Guachama Rancheria Marker, to the south reads:
Guachama Rancheria, lying along this road, was named San Bernardino May 20, 1810, by Francisco Dumetz. In 1819 it became the San Bernardino Rancho of Mission San Gabriel. The adobe administration building stood about 70 yds. north of this spot, an enramada serving as chapel. The Zanja was constructed to convey water from the mountains for irrigation. Control by mission fathers ended in 1834. Erected 1932 by Arrowhead Chapter Daughters of the American Revolution. (Marker Number 95.)

See also
California Historical Landmarks in San Bernardino County, California
California Historical Landmarks in Riverside County, California
History of San Bernardino, California

References

California Historical Landmarks
1856 establishments in California
History of San Bernardino County, California
Benson